In August 2010, the Mexican professional wrestling promotion Consejo Mundial de Lucha Libre (CMLL) will hold a total of four CMLL Super Viernes shows, all of which will take place Arena México on Friday nights. CMLL does not currently have plans to hold any special events on Fridays that would force a cancellation such as a pay-per-view (PPV). Some of the matches from Super Viernes are taped for CMLL's weekly shows that air in Mexico the week following the Super Viernes show. Super Viernes often features storyline feud between two wrestlers or group of wrestlers that develop from week to week, often coming to a conclusion at a major CMLL event or in a match on Friday nights between the individuals.

August 6, 2010

The August 6, 2010 Super Viernes was a professional wrestling event held by Consejo Mundial de Lucha Libre (CMLL) in their home arena Arena Mexico. The show hosted the second block of the 2010 Universal Championship tournament, with seven tournament matches.the following champions were involved in Block B on Jushin Thunder Liger, Negro Casas, Héctor Garza, Mr. Águila, La Mascara, Volador Jr., Valiente, Metro.

August 13, 2010

The August 13, 2010 Super Viernes was a professional wrestling event held by Consejo Mundial de Lucha Libre (CMLL) in their home arena Arena Mexico. the show hosted the finals of the 2010 Universal Championship tournament which saw Jushin Thunder Liger defeated La Sombra to win the tournament.

References

2010 in professional wrestling
CMLL Super Viernes